Ebchester railway station served the village of Ebchester, County Durham, England from 1867 to 1963 on the Derwent Valley Railway.

History 
The station opened on 2 December 1867 by the North Eastern Railway. It was situated on the east side of Ebchester Hill on the B6309. The site of the station had a large station yard and worker's cottages. It closed to passengers on 21 September 1953. and to goods traffic on 11 November 1963.

References

External links 

Disused railway stations in County Durham
Former North Eastern Railway (UK) stations
Railway stations in Great Britain opened in 1867
Railway stations in Great Britain closed in 1953
1867 establishments in England
1953 disestablishments in England
Ebchester